Jared Heyman is an American entrepreneur who founded the online survey company Infosurv. He has a business degree from the University of Texas and holds two US patents.

While studying at the University of Texas at Austin, Heyman had internships at Bain & Company and Collective Technologies, a small tech firm. Jared Heyman graduated magna cum laude with a business degree. He founded Infosurv in 1998 in Atlanta, Georgia.  Infosurv is an Internet survey company specializing in employee and customer surveys for market research purposes, which Heyman grew to over $20M in aggregate revenue. In 2013, Infosurv spun out a new company called Intengo, which uses crowdsourcing techniques to help clients develop new ideas and go-to-market strategies.

Jared Heyman then served as chief executive officer and founder of CrowdMed, established April 2013, which is a crowdsourcing platform where people submit medical cases and get suggested diagnosis information to take to their doctors. The company was inspired by his sister who had a rare genetic disease that took three years to diagnose and has raised $4.2M in venture capital from Silicon Valley venture capital firms and individual investors including actor Patrick Dempsey, 23andMe founder Anne Wojcicki, and Y Combinator president Sam Altman Heyman then served as a General Partner at Pioneer Fund, a venture capital fund that pools capital and expertise from 100+ Y Combinator alumni to support the next generation of YC startups and currently serves as Managing Partner of Rebel Fund, whose mission is “to leverage data science and Silicon Valley’s most accomplished founders to invest in a diversified portfolio of Y Combinator startups statistically powered to outperform”.

In 2014, Heyman gave a TEDMED talk to reveal how crowd wisdom can help solve even the most elusive medical mysteries. IHC reports that Heyman has been quoted or featured in hundreds of news articles

References

McCombs School of Business alumni
American company founders
American chief executives